Mory Koné (born 21 April 1994) is a French professional footballer who plays as a centre-back for Vierzon FC.

Koné is of Ivorian descent and has represented both his birth and ancestral nation at international level. He has represented France at under-17 and under-18 level, while he represented Ivory Coast at the 2011 FIFA U-17 World Cup.

Club career

Le Mans
Koné was born in Paris. Ahead of the 2012–13 season, he was promoted to Le Mans's senior team by manager Denis Zanko and assigned the number 21 shirt. Koné made his professional debut on 7 August 2012 in a Coupe de la Ligue match against Laval.

Parma
On 31 August 2013, it was confirmed that Koné moved to Serie A side Parma from Le Mans. He joined Crotone in Serie B on 17 January 2014, signing a loan deal until the end of the 2013–14 season.

Troyes
After a year in Italy, Koné returned France signing a three-year contract with Ligue 2 side ESTAC.

In January 2018, he joined Tours FC of Ligue 2 on loan for the rest of the season.

International career

France
Although Kone has represented France at U17, U18 and U19 level, he has never represented them in an official competition. Kone represented France U17 in a friendly versus Russia on 5 August 2010, France lost 3–0. A year later, he played in a 2–0 loss against Ukraine at U18 level. He also played in two victories over Finland in May 2012 at U18 level. He has represented France U19 twice, on 8 September 2012 versus Switzerland in a 1–0 victory and again on 14 November 2012 in a 3–0 loss to Germany.

Ivory Coast
In June 2011, he represented Ivory Coast in the U17 FIFA World Cup, he played in four games and featured in a 3–2 loss against France.

Career statistics

Club

References

External links
 
 
 
 
 
 

Living people
1994 births
French sportspeople of Ivorian descent
French footballers
Ivorian footballers
Footballers from Paris
Association football defenders
France youth international footballers
Ivory Coast youth international footballers
Ligue 1 players
Ligue 2 players
Le Mans FC players
Parma Calcio 1913 players
F.C. Crotone players
ES Troyes AC players
Tours FC players
Entente SSG players
Vierzon FC players
French expatriate footballers
French expatriate sportspeople in Italy
Expatriate footballers in Italy